The Spring 2021 SWAC Championship Game was a college football game played on Saturday, May 1, 2021, at Mississippi Veterans Memorial Stadium in Jackson, Mississippi.  It was the 22nd SWAC Championship Game and determined the 2020 champion of the Southwestern Athletic Conference (SWAC). Sponsored by wireless service provider Cricket, the game was officially known as the Spring 2021 Cricket SWAC Football Championship. 

While prior editions of the SWAC Championship Game had been played in December, this edition was delayed into May due to impact of the COVID-19 pandemic on the 2020–21 NCAA Division I FCS football season.

Teams

Alabama A&M Bulldogs

Alabama A&M entered the championship game 3-0. Alabama A&M had won the championship game once prior in 2006.

Arkansas–Pine Bluff

Arkansas–Pine Bluff entered the championship game 4-0. Arkansas-Pine Bluff had won the championship game once prior in 2012.

Game summary

References

Championship Game
2021 05
Alabama A&M Bulldogs football games
Arkansas–Pine Bluff Golden Lions football games
College sports in Mississippi
Sports competitions in Mississippi
Sports in Jackson, Mississippi
SWAC Championship Game
SWAC Championship Game